This is a list of hospitals and other public health institutions in Slovenia.

Medical centres
Ljubljana University Medical Centre - Ljubljana
Maribor University Medical Centre - Maribor

General hospitals
Brežice General Hospital - Brežice
Celje General Hospital - Celje
Izola General Hospital - Izola
Jesenice General Hospital - Jesenice
Murska Sobota General Hospital - Murska Sobota
Franc Derganc General Hospital of Nova Gorica - Šempeter pri Gorici
Novo Mesto General Hospital - Novo Mesto
Jože Potrč General Hospital of Ptuj - Ptuj
Slovenj Gradec General Hospital - Slovenj Gradec
Trbovlje General Hospital - Trbovlje

Psychiatric hospitals
Begunje Psychiatric Hospital - Begunje
Idrija Psychiatric Hospital - Idrija
Ormož Psychiatric Hospital - Ormož
Vojnik Psychiatric Hospital - Vojnik
Ljubljana University Psychiatric Clinic - Ljubljana

Special hospitals
Šentvid pri Stični Centre for Children's Health Care - Šentvid pri Stični
Kranj Gynecology and Obstetrics Hospital, Kranj
Topolšica Hospital - Topolšica
Ljubljana Institute of Oncology - Ljubljana
Postojna Obstetrics and Gynaecology Hospital - Postojna
Valdoltra Orthopedic Specialty Hospital - Valdoltra
Golnik University Clinic of Respiratory and Allergic Diseases - Golnik
University Rehabilitation Institute, Republic of Slovenia - Ljubljana

References

Slovenia
 
Hospitals
Slovenia